Events from the year 1919 in Croatia.

Incumbents

National
 Monarch – Peter I (ruler of the Kingdom of the Serbs, Croats and Slovenes)
 Prime Ministers:
Stojan Protić (People's Radical Party) until 16 August 1919
Ljubomir Davidović (Democratic Party) from 16 August 1919

Events
Fran Krsto Frankopan and Petar Zrinski were reburied in the Zagreb Cathedral.

Arts and literature

Sport
The Yugoslav Olympic Committee founded in Zagreb. Recognized by the International Olympic Committee in 1920, it was later moved to Belgrade in 1927.

Births
January 10 – Janko Bobetko, general (died 2003)
January 15 – Mladen Delić, sports commentator (died 2005)
April 15 – Franjo Kuharić, cardinal (died 2002)
July 28 – Milan Horvat, conductor (died 2014)
December 8 – Marijan Oblak, archbishop (died 2008)
December 18 – Jure Kaštelan, poet (died 1990)

Deaths
February 10 – Antun Radić, scientist and politician (born 1868)
May 26 – Milan Amruš, politician (born 1848)

References

 
Years of the 20th century in Croatia
Croatia